Kateryna Vasylivna Kostenko (also known as Ekaterina Kostenko from ; born 30 June 1984) is a Ukrainian retired pair skater. With Roman Talan, she is the 2009 Ukrainian national champion and represented Ukraine at the 2010 Winter Olympics.

Personal life
Kateryna Kostenko was born in Dnipropetrovsk, Ukrainian SSR. She married Roman Talan in 2011 and their daughter, also named Kateryna, was born on 25 February 2012.

Career
Kostenko teamed up with Roman Talan when she was 21 years old and he 17. Gold medalists at the 2009 Ukrainian Championships, they represented their country at the 2008 and 2009 European Championships, 2010 World Championships, and 2010 Winter Olympics. They ended their competitive career in 2010 and began coaching in Dnipropetrovsk.

Kostenko coached Elizaveta Usmantseva / Roman Talan, who qualified a spot for Ukraine in the pairs' event at the 2014 Winter Olympics but it was later assigned to another pair.

Programs
(with Talan)

Results
(with Talan)

References

External links 

 

Ukrainian female pair skaters
Living people
1984 births
Sportspeople from Dnipro
Olympic figure skaters of Ukraine
Figure skaters at the 2010 Winter Olympics
Competitors at the 2009 Winter Universiade